George Albert Wade (19 July 1891 – 27 January 1986) was an English pottery manufacturer. Born in Burslem to a family who ran a pottery business, he was knighted in 1955 for political and public services.

Wade was a pupil at Newcastle High School, which has been amalgamated into the Newcastle-under-Lyme School, and left at age 15 to work at the family's pottery factory. He was a soldier between 1914 and 1919 in World War I, first as a private with the North Staffordshire Regiment, and then as a lieutenant with the South Staffordshire Regiment in the Machine Gun Corps, and he served in France and Egypt.  He married Florrie Johnson in 1915.

Wade became chairman of the family's pottery business, Wade Ceramics Ltd, a manufacturer of porcelain and earthenware, whose main factory was in Burslem, Stoke-on-Trent.  In the 1950s, Wade Ceramics created and manufactured "Whimsies", small cheap solid porcelain animal figures, which became popular and collectable in Britain and America.

Wade never fully stopped working, but in the early 1980s he gave the routine running of the business to his son George Anthony (Tony) Johnson Wade. His hobbies included painting and ornithology.

References

1891 births
1986 deaths
Knights Bachelor
Staffordshire pottery
English potters
People educated at Newcastle-under-Lyme School
North Staffordshire Regiment soldiers
South Staffordshire Regiment officers
20th-century ceramists
British Army personnel of World War I
Machine Gun Corps officers
Military personnel from Staffordshire